Hamilton Gorges (1711 – 8 April 1786) was an Anglo-Irish politician. 

Gorges was the Member of Parliament for Coleraine in the Irish House of Commons between 1757 and 1760, before representing Swords from 1761 to 1768.

He was the father of Richard Gorges-Meredyth.

References

1711 births
1786 deaths
18th-century Anglo-Irish people
Irish MPs 1727–1760
Irish MPs 1761–1768
Members of the Parliament of Ireland (pre-1801) for County Dublin constituencies
Members of the Parliament of Ireland (pre-1801) for County Londonderry constituencies